Himmelskibet may refer to:
 Himmelskibet (film) a 1918 Danish film
 Himmelskibet (thrill ride), an amusement ride in Tivoli Gardens, Copenhagen